The British Commonwealth Occupation Force (BCOF) was the British Commonwealth taskforce consisting of Australian, British, Indian and New Zealand military forces in occupied Japan, from 1946 until the end of occupation in 1952.

At its peak, the BCOF committed about 40,000 personnel, that comprised 25% of the occupation force, which was equal to about a third of the number of US military personnel in Japan.

History

Background
Following the dropping of atomic bombs and the entry of the Soviet Union into the war against Japan, the Japanese Empire surrendered to the Allies on 15 August 1945, with their government accepting the Potsdam Declaration. The formal surrender was signed on 2 September in Tokyo Bay. Unlike in the occupation of Germany, the Soviet Union had little to no influence over the occupation of Japan, leaving the Americans, British and Commonwealth Forces responsible for occupation duties.

Whilst US forces were responsible for military government, the BCOF was responsible for supervising demilitarisation and the disposal of Japan's war industries. The BCOF was also responsible for the occupation of the western prefectures of Shimane, Yamaguchi, Tottori, Okayama, Hiroshima and Shikoku Island. BCOF headquarters was at Kure, a naval port near Hiroshima. At the height of its involvement, the British Commonwealth Occupation Force was responsible for 20 million Japanese citizens in an area of around 57,000 km2.

Occupation
The participation of BCOF in the Allied occupation of Japan was announced on 31 January 1946, however this announcement was already in planning stages since the end of the war. On 21 February 1946, the initial contingent arrived at the former Imperial Japanese Navy base at Kure, near the devastated city of Hiroshima, became the main base for Australian and British warships. A Royal Navy shore party took control of the port and facilities and these were commissioned as HMS Commonwealth on 3 June 1946.
For most of the occupation period, Australia contributed the majority of the BCOF's personnel. The initial BCOF presence included the Australian 34th Brigade; the 9th Brigade, 2nd New Zealand Expeditionary Force (J Force); and the British Indian Division (BRINDIV) (later known as BRINJAP), a composite British and Indian division made up of the British 5th Infantry Brigade Group (from 2nd Infantry Division in India), and the 268th Indian Infantry Brigade. BCOF was supported by the Women's Auxiliary Service (Burma) (which derived its name from its formation during the Second World War, to provide amenities to Commonwealth forces in the Burmese campaign).

By 1948, BCOF was solely staffed by Australian military personnel, with all British, Indian and New Zealand troops withdrawn from the occupation.

The British Pacific Fleet initially provided most of the naval forces, with it consisting of primarily British ships alongside contingents of Commonwealth and US ships. The air component, known as the British Commonwealth Air Forces (BCAIR), initially comprised the Royal Australian Air Force's No. 81 Fighter Wing, four Spitfire squadrons (including No. 11 and No. 17 of the Royal Air Force and No. 4 of the Indian Air Force), and No. 14 Squadron of the Royal New Zealand Air Force.

During 1947, the BCOF began to wind down its presence in Japan. However, BCOF bases provided staging posts for Commonwealth forces deployed to the Korean War, from 1950 onwards. The BCOF was effectively wound-up in 1951, as control of Commonwealth forces in Japan was transferred to British Commonwealth Forces Korea.

Organisation
The major units that composed the force were:
 British Indian Division
 34th Australian Infantry Brigade
 65th Battalion
 66th Battalion
 67th Battalion
 'A' Battery, Royal Australian Artillery
 1st Armoured Car Squadron
 9th New Zealand Infantry Brigade (J Force)
 22nd Battalion
 27th Battalion
 2nd Divisional Cavalry Regiment
 5th British Infantry Brigade (renumbered, 25th Independent Infantry Brigade)
 1st Battalion, Queen's Own Cameron Highlanders
 2nd Battalion, Dorsetshire Regiment
 2nd Battalion, Royal Welch Fusiliers
 268th Indian Infantry Brigade
 5th Battalion, 1st Punjab Regiment
 2nd Battalion, 5th Royal Gurkha Rifles
 1st Battalion, 5th Mahratta Light Infantry
 British Commonwealth Air Forces:
 No. 81 Wing RAAF
 No. 76 Squadron RAAF
 No. 77 Squadron RAAF
 No. 82 Squadron RAAF
 No. 11 Squadron RAF
 No. 17 Squadron RAF
 No. 4 Squadron IAF
 No. 14 Squadron RNZAF

Commanders
The position of Commander-if-Chief, BCOF was always filled by an Australian, and included:
 Lieutenant General John Northcott (February to June 1946); 
 Lieutenant General Sir Horace Robertson (June 1946 to November 1951); and
 Lieutenant General William Bridgeford (November 1951 to April 1952)

The largest formation in BCOF, BRINDIV, was commanded by Major General David Cowan, from 1945 to 1947.

Gallery

References

Further reading
 
 George Davies, The Occupation of Japan: The Rhetoric and the Reality of Anglo-Australasian relations 1939 – 1952, 2001
 John Dower, Embracing Defeat: Japan in the Wake of World War II, 2000
 Melissa Miles & Robin Gerster, Pacific Exposures: Photograph and the Australia-Japan Relationship, 2018
 Peter Bates, Japan and the British Commonwealth Occupation Force 1946 – 1952, 1993
 Robin Gerster, Travels in Atomic Sunshine: Australia and the Occupation of Japan, 2008
 Takemae Eiji, The Allied Occupation of Japan, 2002

External links

 Australian War Memorial, British Commonwealth Occupation Force 1946 – 1951
 The Australian Military Contribution to the Occupation of Japan 1945–1952 / Dr James Wood
 Unofficial website dedicated to the force

 
Military installations of Japan
Australia–Japan military relations
India–Japan military relations
Japan–New Zealand relations
Japan–United Kingdom military relations